The European Journal of Paediatric Neurology is a bimonthly peer-reviewed medical journal that covers all aspects of pediatric neurology. It was established in 1997 and is published by Elsevier on behalf of the European Paediatric Neurology Society. The first issue was published by Saunders on behalf of the EPNS. The editor-in-chief is  Sameer Zuberi  (S. M. Zuberi) of the Royal Hospital for Children, Glasgow, Glasgow, United Kingdom.

Abstracting and indexing 
The journal is abstracted and indexed in:
MEDLINE
PubMed
Index medicus

References

External links 
 

Bimonthly journals
Elsevier academic journals
Publications established in 1997
Neurology journals
English-language journals
Academic journals associated with international learned and professional societies of Europe